Isadora "Izzy" Camina is a British-American music producer. Born in Venice, California, Izzy began making beats on Fruity Loops in highschool, before transitioning to Ableton Live. She released independently under the name ISADORA, including her self written and produced EP, Battle Royale. Two of the songs off of the EP reached the top 25 on Spotify's UK Viral Charts.

In 2020, under "Izzy Camina", she released the tracks "UP N DOWN",  "Nihilist In The Club", and "Kill Your Local Indie Softboy". Regarding the latter, Izzy states “I wrote this song in Spring 2017 as a joke, obviously,”. “In New Jersey where I’m from, guys like to vape and go to car meets, or maybe they watch Joe Rogan and go to sports bars. Either way; plucky, bright-eyed, and very single me was not prepared for this new phenomenon of softboyism I would shortly encounter upon moving to East London. Alarmed by their numbers, I realized that this alluring faction would probably end up occupying a great deal of my headspace. I was right, and the resulting fallout is tenderly embodied by this fond ode… A heartfelt dedication.”

She cites Jersey club, UK garage, experimental electronic, synth wave, post punk, and pop as genre influences. In 2020, she described her music as “Cyberpunk Britney Spears”.

References

Living people
Musicians from California
Musicians from New Jersey
People from Venice, Los Angeles
Year of birth missing (living people)